The joint quantum entropy generalizes the classical joint entropy to the context of quantum information theory. Like other entropies, the joint quantum entropy is measured in bits, i.e. the logarithm is taken in base 2.

In this article, we will use  for the joint quantum entropy.

Background

At the other extreme, if  is the uniform probability distribution with  possible values, intuitively one would expect  is associated with the most uncertainty. Indeed such uniform probability distributions have maximum possible entropy .

In quantum information theory, the notion of entropy is extended from probability distributions to quantum states, or density matrices. For a state , the von Neumann entropy is defined by

Applying the spectral theorem, or Borel functional calculus for infinite dimensional systems, we see that it generalizes the classical entropy. The physical meaning remains the same. A maximally mixed state, the quantum analog of the uniform probability distribution, has maximum von Neumann entropy. On the other hand, a pure state, or a rank one projection, will have zero von Neumann entropy.  We write the von Neumann entropy  (or sometimes .

Definition 

Given a quantum system with two subsystems A and B, the term joint quantum entropy simply refers to the von Neumann entropy of the combined system. This is to distinguish from the entropy of the subsystems.
In symbols, if the combined system is in state ,

the joint quantum entropy is then

Each subsystem has its own entropy. The state of the subsystems are given by the partial trace operation.

Properties

The classical joint entropy is always at least equal to the entropy of each individual system.  This is not the case for the joint quantum entropy.  If the quantum state  exhibits quantum entanglement, then the entropy of each subsystem may be larger than the joint entropy.  This is equivalent to the fact that the conditional quantum entropy may be negative, while the classical conditional entropy may never be.

Consider a maximally entangled state such as a Bell state.  If  is a Bell state, say,

then the total system is a pure state, with entropy 0, while each individual subsystem is a maximally mixed state, with maximum von Neumann entropy . Thus the joint entropy of the combined system is less than that of subsystems. This is because for entangled states, definite states cannot be assigned to subsystems, resulting in positive entropy.

Notice that the above phenomenon cannot occur if a state is a separable pure state. In that case, the reduced states of the subsystems are also pure. Therefore all entropies are zero.

Relations to other entropy measures

The joint quantum entropy  can be used to define of the conditional quantum entropy:

and the quantum mutual information:

These definitions parallel the use of the classical joint entropy to define the conditional entropy and mutual information.

See also 

Quantum relative entropy
Quantum mutual information

References
 Nielsen, Michael A. and Isaac L. Chuang, Quantum Computation and Quantum Information.  Cambridge University Press, 2000. 

Quantum mechanical entropy
Quantum information theory